Miriam E. David FRSA FAcSS (born 9 August 1945) is a British educator. She is Professor of Education at the Institute of Education, University of London and Associate Director of the Teaching and Learning Research Programme.

Education and career
David earned a BA (Hons) in Sociology in 1966 from the University of Leeds. In 1975, she earned her Ph.D in Economics of Education from the University of London. In 1993, she was elected Fellow of the Royal Society of Arts (RSA), and in 1999 she was Elected Academician of the Academy of Learned Societies in the Social Sciences (AcSS).

David has held the following recent major positions:
 1998–2005 – Visiting Professorial Fellow, Institute of Education.
 2002–2004 – Director of the Graduate School of Social Sciences, Keele University.
 2004–2005 – Research Dean, Faculty of Humanities and Social Sciences, Keele University.
 1999– 2005 – Visiting Professor of Policy Studies in Education, Keele University.
 2004–2006 – Professor of Education, Institute of Education, The School of Educational Foundations and Policy Studies.
 2007 (March–April) – ESRC/SSRC Fellowship as Visiting Professor at Harvard University, Graduate School of Education, Ontario Institute for Studies in Education, University of Toronto, University of Wisconsin–Madison, Faculty of Education.
 2004–2008 – Associate Director, Teaching and Learning Research Programme

References

External links
World Who's Who profile for Miriam David; retrieved 10 July 2008.
Institute of Education – Dept of Educational Foundations and Policy Studies – Miriam E. David BA (Hons.,) PhD, AcSS, FRSA; retrieved 10 July 2008.

1945 births
Living people
Place of birth missing (living people)
English people of Jewish descent
Alumni of the UCL Institute of Education
Academics of the UCL Institute of Education
Harvard University staff
Fellows of the Academy of Social Sciences
Alumni of the University of Leeds
Academics of Keele University